La Linière refugee camp was situated in Grande-Synthe, Dunkirk, France. It was opened in March 2016 at a cost of around 4 million Euros.

The camp was a scaled back version of an originally much larger plan. The camp was the first official refugee camp to be built in France. It was built in order to provide emergency relief to the refugees living in the predecessor Basroch refugee camp, which was about 1km away and which had unacceptably poor humanitarian conditions.

The driving force for constructing the new camp was the mayor of Dunkirk and its construction ran contrary to the policy of the National French Government who were keen to move refugees away from the coastal areas.

La Linière housed up to 1500 migrants when it opened with a population which was mainly Iraqi Kurds. The numbers fluctuated considerably during its time rising from around 600 in the summer of 2016 to 1600 in the Autumn of 2016. 

The camp was troubled during its existence and there were allegations that women and children were being subject to rape and beatings in the camp, and that many of the children were simply disappearing. The French government also cited shooting and stabbing violence as issues of concern in the camp.

The camp closed following a devastating fire which occurred after fighting between Afghan and Kurdish residents of the camp in April 2017.

During the time that the camp existed a wide range of organisations worked in the camp supporting refugees. These included AFEJI, MSF, Utopia 56, OFII, Edlumino Education Aid and others.

See also
Calais Jungle

Edlumino
European migrant crisis
Illegal immigration in the United Kingdom
Migrants around Calais
Modern immigration to the United Kingdom
Refugees of Iraq
Sangatte

External links 
 Frontline Doctors: Winter Migrant Crisis is a BBC documentary featuring a visit to La Linière refugee camp in March 2016.

References

Refugee camps in Europe
Calais migrant crisis (1999–present)
European migrant crisis
Illegal immigration to France